The following are lists of musicals, including musical theatre and musical films.

Musical theatre lists
List of highest-grossing musicals
List of the longest-running Broadway shows
List of the longest-running West End shows
List of musicals: A to L
List of musicals: M to Z
List of musicals by composer: A to L
List of musicals by composer: M to Z
List of musicals filmed live on stage
List of rock musicals
List of stage jukebox musicals
List of Tony Award- and Olivier Award-winning musicals
Long-running musical theatre productions
Long runs on the London stage, 1700–2020

Musical film lists
List of films based on stage plays or musicals
List of highest-grossing musical films
List of musical films by year
Lists of Bollywood films